U-135 may refer to one of the following German submarines:

 , a Type U 127 submarine launched in 1917 and that served in the First World War until surrendered on 20 November 1918; grounded on east coast of England on way to be broken up in 1921
 During the First World War, Germany also had this submarine with a similar name:
 , a Type UB III submarine ordered in 1917 but not completed by the end of the war
 , a Type VIIC submarine that served in the Second World War until sunk 15 July 1943

Submarines of Germany